An iceberg is a piece of freshwater ice more than 15 m long that has broken off a glacier or an ice shelf and is floating freely in open (salt) water. Smaller chunks of floating glacially-derived ice are called "growlers" or "bergy bits". The sinking of the Titanic in 1912 led to the formation of the International Ice Patrol in 1914. Much of an iceberg is below the surface, which led to the expression "tip of the iceberg" to illustrate a small part of a larger unseen issue. Icebergs are considered a serious maritime hazard.

Icebergs vary considerably in size and shape. Icebergs that calve from glaciers in Greenland are often irregularly shaped while Antarctic ice shelves often produce large tabular (table top) icebergs. This iceberg was larger than Belgium.

Etymology
The word iceberg is a partial loan translation from the Dutch word ijsberg, literally meaning  ice mountain, cognate to Danish isbjerg, German Eisberg, Low Saxon Iesbarg and Swedish isberg.

Overview
The contour of the underwater portion can be difficult to judge by looking at the portion above the surface. 

The largest icebergs recorded have been calved, or broken off, from the Ross Ice Shelf of Antarctica. Icebergs or pieces of floating ice smaller than 5 meters above the sea surface are classified as "bergy bits"; smaller than 1 meter—"growlers".

Drift 
A given iceberg's trajectory through the ocean can be modelled by integrating the equation

      

where m is the iceberg mass, v the drift velocity, and the variables f, k, and F correspond to the Coriolis force, the vertical unit vector, and a given force. The subscripts a, w, r, s, and p correspond to the air drag, water drag, wave radiation force, sea ice drag, and the horizontal pressure gradient force.

Icebergs deteriorate through melting and fracturing, which changes the mass m, as well as the surface area, volume, and stability of the iceberg. Iceberg deterioration and drift, therefore, are interconnected iceberg thermodynamics, and fracturing must be considered when modelling iceberg drift.

Winds and currents may move icebergs close to coastlines, where they can become frozen into pack ice (one form of sea ice), or drift into shallow waters, where they can come into contact with the seabed, a phenomenon called seabed gouging.

Bubbles 
Air trapped in snow forms bubbles as the snow is compressed to form firn and then glacial ice. Icebergs can contain up to 10% air bubbles by volume. These bubbles are released during melting, producing a fizzing sound that some may call "Bergie Seltzer". This sound results when the water-ice interface reaches compressed air bubbles trapped in the ice. As each bubble bursts it makes a "popping" sound and the acoustic properties of these bubbles can be used to study iceberg melt.

Stability 
An iceberg may flip, or capsize, as it melts and breaks apart, changing the center of gravity. Capsizing can occur shortly after calving when the iceberg is young and establishing balance. Icebergs are unpredictable and can capsize anytime and without warning. Large icebergs that break off from a glacier front and flip onto the glacier face can push the entire glacier backwards for a few minutes, producing earthquakes that give off as much energy as an atomic bomb.

Color
Icebergs are generally white because they are covered in snow, but can be green, blue, yellow, black, striped, or even rainbow-colored. Seawater, algae and lack of air bubbles in the ice can create diverse colors. Sediment can create the dirty black coloration present in some icebergs.

Shape

In addition to size classification (Table 1), icebergs can be classified on the basis of their shapes. The two basic types of iceberg forms are tabular and non-tabular. Tabular icebergs have steep sides and a flat top, much like a plateau, with a length-to-height ratio of more than 5:1.

This type of iceberg, also known as an ice island, can be quite large, as in the case of Pobeda Ice Island. Antarctic icebergs formed by breaking off from an ice shelf, such as the Ross Ice Shelf or Filchner-Ronne Ice Shelf, are typically tabular. The largest icebergs in the world are formed this way.

Non-tabular icebergs have different shapes and include:

 Dome: An iceberg with a rounded top.
 Pinnacle: An iceberg with one or more spires.
 Wedge: An iceberg with a steep edge on one side and a slope on the opposite side.
 Dry-dock: An iceberg that has eroded to form a slot or channel.
 Blocky: An iceberg with steep, vertical sides and a flat top. It differs from tabular icebergs in that its aspect ratio, the ratio between its width and height, is small, more like that of a block than a flat sheet.

Monitoring and control

History

Prior to 1914 there was no system in place to track icebergs to guard ships against collisions. despite fatal sinkings of ships by icebergs. In 1907, SS Kronprinz Wilhelm, a German liner, rammed an iceberg and suffered a crushed bow, but was still able to complete her voyage. The advent of steel ship construction led designers to declare their ships "unsinkable".

The April 1912 sinking of the Titanic, which killed 1,496 of its 2,223 passengers and crew, discredited this claim. For the remainder of the ice season of that year, the United States Navy patrolled the waters and monitored ice movements. In November 1913, the International Conference on the Safety of Life at Sea met in London to devise a more permanent system of observing icebergs. Within three months the participating maritime nations had formed the International Ice Patrol (IIP). The goal of the IIP was to collect data on meteorology and oceanography to measure currents, ice-flow, ocean temperature, and salinity levels. They monitored iceberg dangers near the Grand Banks of Newfoundland and provided the "limits of all known ice" in that vicinity to the maritime community. The IIP published their first records in 1921, which allowed for a year-by-year comparison of iceberg movement.

Technological development

Aerial surveillance of the seas in the early 1930s allowed for the development of charter systems that could accurately detail the ocean currents and iceberg locations. In 1945, experiments tested the effectiveness of radar in detecting icebergs. A decade later, oceanographic monitoring outposts were established for the purpose of collecting data; these outposts continue to serve in environmental study. A computer was first installed on a ship for the purpose of oceanographic monitoring in 1964, which allowed for a faster evaluation of data. By the 1970s, ice-breaking ships were equipped with automatic transmissions of satellite photographs of ice in Antarctica. Systems for optical satellites had been developed but were still limited by weather conditions. In the 1980s, drifting buoys were used in Antarctic waters for oceanographic and climate research. They are equipped with sensors that measure ocean temperature and currents.

Side looking airborne radar (SLAR) made it possible to acquire images regardless of weather conditions. On November 4, 1995, Canada launched RADARSAT-1. Developed by the Canadian Space Agency, it provides images of Earth for scientific and commercial purposes. This system was the first to use synthetic aperture radar (SAR), which sends microwave energy to the ocean surface and records the reflections to track icebergs. The European Space Agency launched ENVISAT (an observation satellite that orbits the Earth's poles) on March 1, 2002. ENVISAT employs advanced synthetic aperture radar (ASAR) technology, which can detect changes in surface height accurately. The Canadian Space Agency launched RADARSAT-2 in December 2007, which uses SAR and multi-polarization modes and follows the same orbit path as RADARSAT-1.

Modern monitoring

Iceberg concentrations and size distributions are monitored worldwide by the U.S. National Ice Center (NIC), established in 1995, which produces analyses and forecasts of Arctic, Antarctic, Great Lakes and Chesapeake Bay ice conditions. More than 95% of the data used in its sea ice analyses are derived from the remote sensors on polar-orbiting satellites that survey these remote regions of the Earth.

The NIC is the only organization that names and tracks all Antarctic Icebergs. It assigns each iceberg larger than  along at least one axis a name composed of a letter indicating its point of origin and a running number. The letters used are as follows:
A – longitude 0° to 90° W (Bellingshausen Sea, Weddell Sea)
B – longitude 90° W to 180° (Amundsen Sea, Eastern Ross Sea)
C – longitude 90° E to 180° (Western Ross Sea, Wilkes Land)
D – longitude 0° to 90° E (Amery Ice Shelf, Eastern Weddell Sea)
The Danish Meteorological Institute monitors iceberg populations around Greenland using data collected by the synthetic aperture radar (SAR) on the Sentinel-1 satellites.

Iceberg management  
In Labrador and Newfoundland, iceberg management plans have been developed to protect offshore installations from impacts with icebergs.

Commercial use 

In the late 2010s, a business from the UAE wanted to tow an iceberg from Antarctica to the Middle East, but the plan failed as the estimated cost of $200 million was too high. In 2019, a German company, Polewater, announced plans to tow Antarctic icebergs to places like South Africa.

Companies have used iceberg water in products such as bottled water, fizzy ice cubes and alcoholic drinks. For example, Iceberg Beer by Quidi Vidi Brewing Company is made from icebergs found around St. John's, Newfoundland. Although annual iceberg supply in Newfoundland and Labrador exceeds the total freshwater consumption of the United States, in 2016 the province introduced a tax on iceberg harvesting and imposed a limit on how much fresh water can be exported yearly.

Oceanography and ecology 
The freshwater injected into the ocean by melting icebergs can change the density of the seawater in the vicinity of the iceberg.  Fresh melt water released at depth is lighter, and therefore more buoyant, than the surrounding seawater causing it to rise towards the surface. Icebergs can also act as floating breakwaters, impacting ocean waves.

Icebergs contain variable concentrations of nutrients and minerals that are released into the ocean during melting. Iceberg-derived nutrients, particularly the iron contained in sediments, can fuel blooms of phytoplankton.  Samples collected from icebergs in Antarctica, Patagonia, Greenland, Svalbard, and Iceland, however, show that iron concentrations vary significantly, complicating efforts to generalize the impacts of icebergs on marine ecosystems.

Recent large icebergs
It broke apart in November 2002.
1987, Iceberg B-9, 
1998, Iceberg A-38, about 
1999, Iceberg B-17B , shipping alert issued December 2009.
2000, Iceberg B-15 
2002, Iceberg C-19, 
2002, Iceberg B-22, 
2003 broke off, Iceberg B-15A, 
2006, Iceberg D-16, 
2010, Ice sheet, broken off of Petermann Glacier in northern Greenland on August 5, 2010, considered to be the largest Arctic iceberg since 1962. About a month later, this iceberg split into two pieces upon crashing into Joe Island in the Nares Strait next to Greenland. In June 2011, large fragments of the Petermann Ice Islands were observed off the Labrador coast.
2014, Iceberg B-31, 2014
2017, Iceberg A-68, (Larsen C) 
2018, Iceberg B-46, 
2019, Iceberg D-28, 
2021, Iceberg A-74 from the Brunt Ice Shelf, 
2021, Iceberg A-76 from the Ronne Ice Shelf,

See also

 List of recorded icebergs by area
 Drift ice station
 Ice calving
 Ice drift
 Polar ice cap
 Polar ice pack (disambiguation)
 Polynya
 Sea ice
 Seabed gouging by ice
 Shelf ice

References

External links

Iceberg Finder Service for east coast of Canada
Icebergs of The Arctic and Antarctic

Bodies of ice

Ice in transportation
Oceanographical terminology